Aristide Cavallini (26 October 1899 – 18 February 1973) was an Italian racing cyclist. He rode in the 1931 Tour de France.

References

External links
 

1899 births
1973 deaths
Italian male cyclists
Place of birth missing
Cyclists from the Province of Pavia